2019 Malaysia Premier Futsal League was the 1st season of the Malaysia Premier Futsal League after re-branding from the Liga Futsal Kebangsaan. It is the Malaysian professional futsal league for association football clubs, since its establishment in 2004. Melaka United are the defending champions.

Team changes

New teams
 Kedah
 Penang
 Selangor

Withdrawn teams
 Felda United
 Kuantan Rangers
 MBPP
 MPSJ

Teams
For 2019 season, a total of nine clubs compete in league.

League table

Result table

References

External links
 Football Association of Malaysia website
 Stadium Astro website

Liga Futsal Kebangsaan seasons
2019 in Malaysian football
2019 in Asian futsal